"Can't Forget You" is a song by English singer Sonia, released as her second single in September 1989. The mid-tempo song later appeared on her debut album, Everybody Knows, released in 1990.  Contrary to fan speculation, "Can't Forget You" was written specifically for Sonia by Stock Aitken & Waterman; it was not initially offered to Kylie Minogue.

Chart performance
"Can't Forget You" was less-successful than Sonia's debut single, "You'll Never Stop Me Loving You".  It peaked at number 17 in the UK, and spent six weeks in the top 75.  In Ireland, "Can't Forget You" fared better, peaking at number 5, though only spending three weeks on the chart.  In Australia, "Can't Forget You" peaked at number 98 on the ARIA singles chart.

Critical reception
Richard Lowe from Smash Hits wrote, "I think they're splendid [ SAW ] and Sonia's first single was probably the best all year. This one's not quite as catchy and won't do half as well but it's a good tune, well sung, nevertheless."

Formats and track listings
 Cassette single
 "Can't Forget You" - 3:25
 "Can't Forget You" (Instrumental) - 3:25

 7" single
 "Can't Forget You" - 3:25
 "Can't Forget You" (Instrumental) - 3:25

 12" single & CD single
 "Can't Forget You" (Extended Mix) - 6:05
 "Can't Forget You" (Instrumental) - 3:25
 "Can't Forget You" - 3:25

Charts

Credits and personnel
The following people contributed to "Can't Forget You":
Sonia - lead vocals 
Mae McKenna, Tessa Niles - backing vocals 
Mike Stock - keyboards
Matt Aitken - guitars, keyboards
A Linn - drums
Dave Ford - mixing

References

1989 singles
Sonia (singer) songs
Song recordings produced by Stock Aitken Waterman
Songs written by Pete Waterman
Songs written by Matt Aitken
Songs written by Mike Stock (musician)
1989 songs
Chrysalis Records singles